The tables below provide a list of foreign languages most frequently taught in American schools and colleges. They reflect the popularity of these languages in terms of the total number of enrolled students in the United States. (Here, a foreign language means any language other than English and includes American Sign Language.)

Lists 
Below are the top foreign languages studied in public K-12 schools (i.e., primary and secondary schools). The tables correspond to the 18.5% (some 8.9 million) of all K-12 students in the U.S. (about 49 million) who take foreign-language classes.

K-12

Colleges and universities 
Below are the top foreign languages studied in American institutions of higher education (i.e., colleges and universities), based on fall 2016 enrollments.

List of top five most commonly learned languages by year

Grades K-12

Higher education

See also 

 Language education in the United States
 Less Commonly Taught Languages
 French language in the United States
 German language in the United States 
 Italian language in the United States
 Spanish language in the United States
 World language

References

External links 
 Enrollments in languages other than English, Modern Language Association
 2004–05 Language Enrollment Totals by State
 Most Popular Foreign Languages, Forbes

Language education in the United States
United States